Kurilabyssia is a genus of small sea snails, marine gastropod mollusks in the family Pseudococculinidae, the false limpets.

Species
Species within the genus Kurilabyssia include:
 Kurilabyssia antipodensis B.A. Marshall, 1986
 Kurilabyssia squamosa Moskalev, 1976

References

External links
 To ITIS
 To World Register of Marine Species

Pseudococculinidae
Gastropod genera